The Gallo-Italic, Gallo-Italian, Gallo-Cisalpine or simply Cisalpine languages constitute the majority of the Romance languages of northern Italy: Piedmontese, Lombard, Emilian, Ligurian, and Romagnol. In central Italy they are spoken in the northern Marches (Gallo-italic of the Marches); in southern Italy in some language island in Basilicata (Gallo-Italic of Basilicata) and Sicily (Gallo-italic of Sicily).

Although most publications define Venetian as part of the Italo-Dalmatian branch, both Ethnologue and Glottolog group it into the Gallo-Italic languages.

These languages are spoken also in the departement of Alpes-Maritimes in France, Ticino and southern Grisons in Switzerland and the microstates of Monaco and San Marino. They are still spoken to some extent by the Italian diaspora in countries with Italian immigrant communities.

Having a Celtic substratum and a Germanic, mostly Lombardic, superstrate, Gallo-Italian descends from the Latin spoken in northern part of Italia (former Cisalpine Gaul). The group had for part of late antiquity and the early Middle Ages a close linguistic link with Gaul and Raetia, west and north to the Alps. From the late Middle Ages, the group adopted various characteristics of the Italo-Dalmatian languages of the south.

As a result, the Gallo-Italic languages have characteristics both of the Gallo-Romance languages to the northwest (including French and Arpitan), the Occitano-Romance languages to the west (including Catalan and Occitan) and the Italo-Dalmatian languages to the north-east, central and south Italy (Venetian, Dalmatian, Tuscan, Central Italian, Neapolitan, Sicilian). For this there is some debate over the proper grouping of the Gallo-Italic languages. They are sometimes grouped with Gallo-Romance, but other linguists group them in Italo-Dalmatian.

Most Gallo-Italic languages have to varying degrees given way in everyday use to regional varieties of Italian. The vast majority of current speakers are diglossic with Italian.

Among the regional languages of Italy, they are the most endangered, since in the main cities of their area (Milan, Turin, Genoa, Bologna) they are mainly used by the elderly.

History

Geographical distribution 
Within this sub-family, the language with the largest geographic spread is Lombard, spoken in the Italian region of Lombardy, in eastern Piedmont and western Trentino. Outside Italy it is widespread in Switzerland in the canton of Ticino, and some southern valleys of the canton of the Grisons.

The Emilian language, western part of the Emilian-Romagnol dialect continuum, is spoken in the historical-cultural region of Emilia, which forms part of Emilia-Romagna, but also in many areas of the bordering regions, including southern Lombardy, south-eastern Piedmont, around the town of Tortona, province of Massa and Carrara in Tuscany and Polesine in Veneto, near the Po delta.

Romagnol is spoken in the historical region of Romagna.

Gallo-italic of the Marches (gallo-piceno or gallico-marchigiano) is spoken in the province of Pesaro and Urbino e in the northern part of the province of Ancona (the Marches).

Piedmontese refers to the languages spoken in the region of Piedmont and the north west corner of Liguria. Historically, the Piedmontese-speaking area is the plain at the foot of the Western Alps, and ends at the entrance to the valleys where Occitan and Arpitan are spoken. In recent centuries, the language has also spread into these valleys, where it is also more widely spoken than these two languages, thus the borders of Piedmontese have reached the western alps watershed that is the border with France.

The speaking area of Ligurian or Genoese cover the territory of the former Republic of Genoa, which included much of nowadays Liguria, and some mountain areas of bordering regions near the Ligurian border, the upper valley of Roya river near Nice, in Carloforte and Calasetta in Southern Sardinia, and Bonifacio in Corsica.

Isolated varieties in Sicily and in Basilicata (Southern Gallo-Italic variants) 

Varieties of Gallo-Italic languages are also found in Sicily, corresponding with the central-eastern parts of the island that received large numbers of immigrants from Northern Italy, called Lombards, during the decades following the Norman conquest of Sicily (around 1080 to 1120). Given the time that has lapsed and the influence from the Sicilian language itself, these dialects are best generically described as Southern Gallo-Italic. The major centres where these dialects can still be heard today include Piazza Armerina, Aidone, Sperlinga, San Fratello, Nicosia, and Novara di Sicilia. Northern Italian dialects did not survive in some towns in the province of Catania that developed large Lombard communities during this period, namely Randazzo, Paternò and Bronte. However, the Northern Italian influence in the local varieties of Sicilian are marked. In the case of San Fratello, some linguists suggested that the nowadays dialect has Provençal as its basis, having been a fort manned by Provençal mercenaries in the early decades of the Norman conquest (bearing in mind that it took the Normans 30 years to conquer the whole of the island).

Other dialects, attested from 13th and 14th century, are also found in Basilicata, more precisely in the province of Potenza (Tito, Picerno, Pignola and Vaglio Basilicata), Trecchina, Rivello, Nemoli and San Costantino.

General classification 

 Gallo-Italic
 Piedmontese
 Ligurian
 Lombard
 Western Lombard dialect
 Eastern Lombard dialect
 Emilian-Romagnol language
 Emilian dialects
 Romagnol dialects
 Gallo-Italic of the Marches (spoken in the Province of Pesaro and Urbino)
(Venetian)
 Gallo-Italic of Sicily
 Gallo-Italic of Basilicata
 Judeo-Italian

Phonology 
Gallo-Italic languages are often said to resemble Western Romance languages like French, Spanish, or Portuguese, and in large part it is due to their phonology.
The Gallo-Italic languages differ somewhat in their phonology from one language to another, but the following are the most important characteristics, as contrasted with Italian:

Vowels
Most Gallo-Italic languages have lost all unstressed final vowels except , e.g. Lombard òm "man", füm "smoke", nef "snow", fil "wire", röda "wheel" (Italian uomo, fumo, neve, filo, ruota).  They remain, however, in Ligurian, with passage of -o to -u, except after n; e.g. ramu, rami, lüme, lümi "branch, branches, light, lights" (Italian ramo, rami, lume, lumi), but can, chen  "dog, dogs" (Italian cane, cani).
u  tends to evolve as ü , as in French and Occitan, as in Lombard füm (Italian fumo "smoke") and Ligurian lüme, Piedmont lüm (Italian lume "light").  In some parts, e.g. southern Piedmont, this has further developed into , e.g. fis (Italian fuso), lim (Italian lume "light").  In some mountainous parts of Piedmont, however (e.g. Biellese, Ossolano), this development was blocked before final , leading to masculine crü (Italian crudo "raw") but feminine cru(v)a (Italian cruda).
This leads at first to diphthongs ie and uo, but in many dialects these progress further, typically to monophthongs i and ö . Unlike standard Italian diphthongization, this typically operates both in open and closed syllables, hence in Lombardy (where typically  but not  triggers metaphony) quest (Italian questo "this") vs. quist (Italian questi "these").
Piedmont beive (Italian bere < *bévere "to drink"), teila (Italian tela "cloth"), meis (Italian mese "month").
Stressed  in an open syllable often fronts to ä  or è .

Consonants
These changes occur before a final vowel drops. After loss of final vowels, however, further changes sometimes affect the newly final consonants, with voiced obstruents often becoming voiceless, and final  sometimes dropping. (Italian aveva le ali? "did it have wings?"; modern a l'aveiva e ae? with restoration of various consonants due to Italian influence). In Liguria and often elsewhere, collapse of adjacent vowels due to loss of an intervocalic consonant produced new long vowels, notated with a circumflex.
Ligurian cian (Italian piano "soft") and giancu (Italian bianco "white").

Lexical comparison

Comparisons of the sentence, "She always closes the window before dining." between different Gallo-Italic languages and other Romance languages

See also 
 Gallo-Italic of Sicily
 Languages of Italy
 List of languages in Europe / Languages of Europe
 Romance plurals

References

Sources 

 Bernard Comrie, Stephen Matthews, Maria Polinsky (eds.), The Atlas of languages : the origin and development of languages throughout the world. New York 2003, Facts On File. p. 40.
 Stephen A. Wurm, Atlas of the World's Languages in Danger of Disappearing. Paris 2001, UNESCO Publishing, p. 29.
 Glauco Sanga: La lingua Lombarda, in Koiné in Italia, dalle origini al 500 (Koinés in Italy, from the origin to 1500), Lubrina publisher, Bèrghem
 Studi di lingua e letteratura lombarda offerti a Maurizio Vitale, (Studies in Lombard language and literature) Pisa : Giardini, 1983
 Brevini, Franco – Lo stile lombardo : la tradizione letteraria da Bonvesin da la Riva a Franco Loi / Franco Brevini – Pantarei, Lugan – 1984 (Lombard style: literary tradition from Bonvesin da la Riva to Franco Loi )
Hull, Geoffrey The Linguistic Unity of Northern Italy and Rhaetia: Historical Grammar of the Padanian Language 2 vols. Sydney: Beta Crucis Editions, 2017. 
 Mussafia Adolfo, Beitrag zur kunde der Norditalienischen Mundarten im XV. Jahrhunderte (Wien, 1873)
 Pellegrini, G.B. "I cinque sistemi dell'italoromanzo", in Saggi di linguistica italiana (Turin: Boringhieri, 1975), pp. 55–87.
 Rohlfs, Gerhard, Rätoromanisch. Die Sonderstellung des Rätoromanischen zwischen Italienisch und Französisch. Eine kulturgeschichtliche und linguistische Einführung (Munich: C.H. Beek'sche, 1975), pp. 1–20.
 Canzoniere Lombardo – by Pierluigi Beltrami, Bruno Ferrari, Luciano Tibiletti, Giorgio D'Ilario – Varesina Grafica Editrice, 1970.

External links